Hartvig is a surname. Notable people with the surname include:

Daniel Hartvig (born 1996), Danish track cyclist
Hans Hartvig-Møller (1873–1953), Danish educator and scouting pioneer

See also
Hartvig (given name)

Danish-language surnames